The Department of Mechanical Science and Engineering at the University of Illinois at Urbana-Champaign (MechSE) is one of 12 departments within the University of Illinois College of Engineering.  The MechSE department was formed in 2006 through a merger of the Theoretical and Applied Mechanics Department with the Mechanical Engineering program from the previous Mechanical and Industrial Engineering Department.  The department offers degrees in mechanical engineering (B.S., M.S., Ph.D.), engineering mechanics (B.S.), and theoretical and applied mechanics (M.S., Ph.D.).

As of 2014, U.S. News & World Report ranked the program the sixth-best US school for undergraduate mechanical engineering program and fifth-best graduate mechanical engineering program.

References

External links
 Department of Mechanical Science and Engineering, University of Illinois at Urbana-Champaign

Mechanical engineering schools
University of Illinois Urbana-Champaign
Educational institutions established in 1867
1867 establishments in Illinois